Semarang United Football Club was an Indonesian football club based in Semarang, Central Java. The team plays in Liga Primer Indonesia.

2010-2011 Squad

2011 Liga Primer Indonesia Result

References

External links
Semarang United at ligaprimerindonesia.co.id

Defunct football clubs in Indonesia
Football clubs in Indonesia
2010 establishments in Indonesia